Hamilton Mountain is a federal electoral district in Ontario, Canada, that has been represented in the House of Commons of Canada since 1968. The riding is located in the Hamilton region.

The socio-economic composition of the Hamilton Mountain is diverse, with low-income public housing residents as well as million-dollar estates, highly-paid unionized workers, low-wage unskilled workers, and well-established families and recent immigrants.

That diversity makes Hamilton Mountain a swing riding in which many elections are virtually two-way or three-way ties. For instance, fewer than 100 votes separated the top two places in 1988. Only 3000 votes separated the top three candidates in 2004. From the 1990s to 2006, the races were between the Liberals and the NDP. After the Liberal Party's collapse in the late 2000s, the Conservatives became the main competitors in the riding. With the Liberal resurgence during the 2015 election, the vote difference between the three major parties have narrowed, solidifying the riding's status as a three-way tossup.

Geography

In the 2012 redistribution, Hamilton Mountain lost area to Hamilton West-Ancaster-Dundas and Flamborough—Glanbrook. The riding was redefined to:

History
The riding was created in 1966 from parts of Ancaster—Dundas—Flamborough—Aldershot, Hamilton South, Hamilton West, Stoney Creek, and Wentworth ridings.

It consisted initially of:
 the part of the City of Hamilton east of a line drawn west along Mud Street, north along Mountain Brow Boulevard, and northwest along the brow of the Mountain; and
 the part of the Township of Glanford in the County of Wentworth lying north of County Suburban Road No. 22.

In 1976, it was redefined to consist of the part of the City of Hamilton lying south of the brow of the Mountain bounded on the east by Red Hill Creek, on the west by the west limit of the city, and on the south by Mohawk Road, Limeridge Road, and Mountain Brow Boulevard.

In 1987, it was redefined to consist of the part of the City of Hamilton lying south of the brow of the Mountain bounded by a line drawn from
Mountain Brow Boulevard, west along Limeridge Road to St. Jerome School, west to Garth Street, south along Garth Street, west along the proposed Mountain Freeway.

In 1996, it was redefined to consist of the part of the City of Hamilton south of a line drawn north from the western city limit near Lisajane Court, east along Stone Church Road, north along Garth Street, east along Redhill Creek Expressway, north along West 5 Street, then east along the brow of the Niagara Escarpment to the eastern city limit.

In 2003, the riding was redefined to consist of the part of the City of Hamilton bounded by a line drawn west from the Niagara Escarpment along Red Hill Valley Parkway|Red Hill Creek, south along Mountain Brow Boulevard, Arbour Road and Glover Road, west along the hydroelectric transmission line situated south of Rymal Road East, north along Glancaster Road, east along Garner Road East, north along the hydroelectric transmission line situated west of Upper Paradise Road, east along Lincoln M. Alexander Parkway, north along West 5th Street, northeast along James Mountain Road, and east and south along the Niagara Escarpment to the point of commencement.

Demographics 
According to the 2021 Canada Census

Ethnic groups: 67.0% White, 5.8% Black, 5.0% South Asian, 4.2% Filipino, 4.1% Arab, 3.0% Indigenous, 2.4% West Asian, 2.3% Latin American, 1.8% Southeast Asian, 1.6% Chinese

Languages: 69.6% English, 3.0% Arabic, 2.5% Italian, 2.3% Spanish, 2.0% Tagalog, 1.4% Aramaic, 1.3% Portuguese, 1.0% French

Religions: 57.4% Christian (30.5% Catholic, 3.8% Anglican, 3.4% United Church, 2.5% Christian Orthodox, 1.6% Presbyterian, 1.4% Pentecostal, 1.4% Baptist, 12.8% Other), 7.7% Muslim, 1.5% Hindu, 30.9% None

Median income: $39,200 (2020)

Average income: $46,360 (2020)

Members of Parliament
This riding has elected the following Members of Parliament:

Election results

			

Note: Conservative vote is compared to the total of the Canadian Alliance vote and Progressive Conservative vote in 2000 election.

Note: Canadian Alliance vote is compared to the Reform vote in 1997 election.

See also
 List of Canadian federal electoral districts
 Past Canadian electoral districts

References

Federal riding history from the Library of Parliament

Notes

Ontario federal electoral districts
Politics of Hamilton, Ontario
1966 establishments in Ontario